"Love, Need and Want You" is a song recorded by American singer Patti LaBelle from her sixth studio album, I'm in Love Again (1983). The mid-tempo R&B song was written and produced for LaBelle by Bunny Sigler and Kenny Gamble, and was released in 1984 as the album's second single. Following the success of her breakthrough R&B hit, "If Only You Knew", the song peaked at number 10 on the US Billboard R&B chart. Like "If Only You Knew", the song features LaBelle singing the song at her mid-range whereas in previous songs prior to 1983, LaBelle mostly sang in a straightforward soprano voice.

Samplings and covers
Songs that have sampled "Love, Need and Want You" include:

 "World So Cruel" (1996) by Flesh-n-Bone and Rev. Run of Run-DMC from Flesh-n-Bone's album T.H.U.G.S..
 "Dilemma" (2002) by Nelly and Kelly Rowland of Destiny's Child, which appeared on solo albums by both artists (Nellyville for Nelly and Simply Deep by Rowland), a Grammy Award-winning song that uses an interpolation. LaBelle also appears in the music video as Rowland's mother.
 "Ghettomusick" (2003) by Outkast from their double album Speakerboxxx/The Love Below. Parts of the song in between verses sampled "Love, Need and Want You", and LaBelle performs in both a re-recorded version and the music video.
 "Lay It Down" (2010) by Lloyd, which subsequently appeared in his 2011 album King of Hearts. Responding to its success, LaBelle was called to add in vocals for a remixed version of the song, released as "Lay It Down II: A Tribute to the Legends", which was dedicated to the late Teena Marie and a then-ailing Aretha Franklin. 
 "Lullaby" (2015) by Ciara from her album Jackie.

In addition, Jaguar Wright covered the song for her debut album, Denials, Delusions and Decisions.

Charts

Credits
Lead vocals by Patti LaBelle
Instrumentation by Sigma Sound Studio musicians
Produced by Kenny Gamble and Bunny Sigler

References

Patti LaBelle songs
1984 singles
Philadelphia International Records singles
Soul ballads
Songs written by Kenny Gamble
Songs written by Bunny Sigler
1984 songs
1980s ballads